"Wake Up" is a song by American hip hop recording artist Fetty Wap. The song was released on April 20, 2016 by RGF Productions and 300 Entertainment. The track was produced by Frenzy. It was certified Gold by the RIAA on November 14, 2016.

Music video
The song's accompanying music video premiered on May 27, 2016 on Fetty Wap's YouTube account. The video was filmed at Eastside High School, which Fetty Wap attended, in his hometown of Paterson, New Jersey.

Commercial performance
"Wake Up" debuted at number 84 on Billboard Hot 100 for the chart dated May 14, 2016. It later reached the top 50 on Billboard Hot 100 dated July 23, 2016.

Charts and certifications

Weekly charts

Year-end charts

Certifications

References

External links

2016 singles
2016 songs
Fetty Wap songs
Songs written by Fetty Wap
300 Entertainment singles